Beshara Doumani is a Palestinian-American academic currently serving as the president of Birzeit University.  Prior to that, he was the Mahmoud Darwish Professor of Palestinian Studies at Brown University. His research focuses on groups, places, and time periods marginalized by mainstream scholarship on the early modern and modern Middle East. He is also a public intellectual who writes on the topics of displacement, academic freedom, politics of knowledge production, and the Palestinian condition.

Biography
Doumani is a Palestinian whose family was dispossessed from Haifa during the 1947–1949 Palestine war. He was born in Saudi Arabia but spent his youth in Lebanon until moving to the United States in 1970. He received his B.A. in History from Kenyon College in Ohio in 1977. In 1980, he earned an M.A. from Georgetown University, where he would later receive his Ph.D. in 1990.

Academic career
Before coming to Brown University Department of History in 2012, and establishing the Brown Middle East Studies Program, he was a faculty member at the University of California, Berkeley from 1998-2012, and a tenured professor at the University of Pennsylvania in Philadelphia from 1989-1998.

From 1996 to 1997 he was a fellow at the Woodrow Wilson International Center for Scholars in Washington, DC. From 2001-2002, he was a fellow at the Wissenschaftskolleg zu Berlin, and from 2007-2008 at Harvard University's Radcliffe Institute for Advanced Study in Cambridge, Massachusetts. He was a fellow at the Institute for Advanced Study in Princeton, New Jersey from 2018-2019.

From 2012 to 2018, Doumani was the founding director of Brown University's Center for Middle East Studies. From 2012 to 2020 he was the Joukowsky Family Distinguished Professor of Modern Middle East History at Brown. In July 2020, he became the inaugural Mahmoud Darwish Professor of Palestinian Studies, the first named chair of Palestinian Studies in an American university. The position is named for the Palestinian poet Mahmoud Darwish.

Doumani's specialty is the social, cultural, and legal history of the early modern and modern Middle East.

His books include Family Life in the Ottoman Mediterranean: A Social History (2017), Rediscovering Palestine: Merchants and Peasants in Jabal Nablus 1700-1900, Academic Freedom After September 11 (editor), and Family History in the Middle East: Household, Property and Gender (editor). Doumani has also published numerous articles on Palestinian history and historiography, including “Archiving Palestine and the Palestinians: The Patrimony of Ihsan Nimr," "Palestine Versus the Palestinians? The Iron Laws and Ironies of a People Denied," and "Rediscovering Ottoman Palestine: Writing Palestinians into History," among others.

Doumani is the founder of the New Directions in Palestinian Studies research initiative, and editor of its open-access book series, published by the University of California Press. He serves on the editorial committees of the Journal of Palestine Studies and the Jerusalem Quarterly. In 2017, he received the Sawyer Seminar award from the Andrew W. Mellon Foundation for his proposal, “Displacement and the Making of the Modern World: Histories, Ecologies, and Subjectivities,” and organized the yearlong series of workshops, seminars, courses, and cultural activities for the Seminar.

From 2008-2010, Doumani led a team that produced a strategic plan for the establishment of a Palestinian museum in Birzeit.

Bibliography
 
Rediscovering Palestine: Merchants and Peasants in Jabal Nablus, 1700-1900, University of California Press, 1995. 
Family History in the Middle East: Household, Property, and Gender (editor), SUNY Press, 2003.
Academic Freedom After September 11 (editor), Zone Books/MIT Press, 2006. 
Family Life in the Ottoman Mediterranean: A Social History, Cambridge University Press, 2017.

References

Sources
 Profile of Beshara Doumani at the Institute for Middle East Understanding

21st-century American historians
Historians of the Middle East
Writers on the Middle East
American political writers
American male non-fiction writers
Kenyon College alumni
Georgetown University alumni
University of Pennsylvania faculty
University of California, Berkeley faculty
American people of Palestinian descent
1957 births
Living people
Brown University faculty
Historians from California
Academic staff of Birzeit University